The 1999–2000 Israeli Premier League season was the first in its history. The league had been formed to replace the former top division, Liga Leumit, which became the country's second tier.

Before the season started Ironi Ashdod and Liga Alef side Hapoel Ashdod were merged into F.C. Ashdod.

The season took place from the first match on 14 August 1999 to the final match on 27 May 2000. Hapoel Tel Aviv won the title, teams relegated were Hapoel Kfar Saba, Maccabi Herzliya and Hapoel Jerusalem.

Final table

Results

First and second round

Third round

Top scorers

See also
1999–2000 Toto Cup Al

References
Israel 1999/2000 RSSSF

Israeli Premier League seasons
Israel
1999–2000 in Israeli football leagues